Sierra Cartwright (born 12 October 1963) is an International and two-time USA Today Best-Selling contemporary romance writer who has published more than 30 books, including the mass market paperback Donovan Dynasty Series: Bind, Brand, and Boss.

Career

"Sierra wrote her first book at age nine, a fanfic episode of Star Trek when she was fifteen, and she completed her first romance novel at nineteen.

Sierra took part in a series done by Total-E-Bound Publishing called the Clandestine Classics. The controversial re-vemp of these classics caught the attention of Anderson Cooper 360° and was mentioned on a segment in July 2012.

Her second novel in the Mastered series, "On His Terms" was listed by Look Magazine as one of "Fifty Shades of Grey: 5 Books That Put It To Shame."

The sixth novel in the Mastered series "In The Den" has an article on USA Today.

Sierra was also the keynote speaker at BDSM Writers Con 2016 in NYC. She also co-hosted multiple writing seminars and panels at the Romantic Times books lovers convention.

Notable works
In 2016 Sierra was in two box sets that made the USA Today Best-Seller book list. Bound, Spanked and Loved: 14 Kinky Valentine's Day Stories hit #126 on the list.

The second book "Hero To Obey" featuring John Joseph Quinlan hit No. 108 on the USA Today best-sellers list.

Sierra is widely known for her Mastered Series (Totally Bound Publishing) where her book, "With This Collar" became an International Best-Seller and spent over a week at No. 1 on Amazon's (erotic) best-selling list. The third book in the Mastered Series, "Over The Line" won "BDSM book of the year 2013" through BDSM Book Reviews.

Her Bonds series debuted in May 2014 starting with the book "Crave" which won a Golden Flogger Award in BDSM Light. Book 3, "Command" is a Golden Flogger nominee in BDSM Advanced Category.

Bibliography

By Series
Bonds Series 
 Crave (2014) 
 Claim (2014)  
 Command (2015)

Donovan Dynasty 
 Bind (2015)
 Brand (2015)
 Boss (2016)

Hawkeye Series
 Danger Zone (2008)
 Bend Me Over (2009)
 Make Me (2010)
 Met Her Match (2015)
 A Good Sub Would (2015)

Mastered Series 
 With This Collar (2013)
 On His Terms (2013)
 Over The Line (2013)
 In His Cuffs (2013)
 For The Sub (2013)
 In The Den (2014)

Novels
 Bound and Determined (2011)
 Night of the Senses: Voyeur (2009)
 Signed, Sealed, and Delivered (2008)
 In The Zone (2012) 
 I Heart That city: Double Trouble (2009) 
 Unbound Commitment (2009)
 Jane Eyre (2012)

Novellas
 Master Class: Initiation (2016)
 One Night in Vegas: Master Class: Hard Hand (2016)
 Walk on the Wild Side (2007) 
 Her Two Doms (2013)
 Bound to the Billionaire: Bared to Him (2013) 
 Naughty Nibbles: This Time  (2008)
 Naughty Nibbles: Fed Up (2008) 
 Bound Brits: S&M 101 (2009) 
 Subspace: Three-way Tie (2012) 
 Night of the Senses: Voyeur (2009) 
 Homecoming: Unbound Surrender (2010)

Box Sets
Doms of Dark Haven 
Doms of Dark Haven 2: Western Nights
Bound, Spanked and Loved
One Night in Vegas 
Hero to Obey

References

1963 births
Living people